WTOC may refer to:

 WTOC-TV, a television station (channel 11) licensed to Savannah, Georgia, United States
 WTOC (AM), a radio station (1360 AM) licensed to Newton, New Jersey, United States
 World Trail Orienteering Championships; see also Trail orienteering